The Men's 200 meter Race at the IPC Athletics Asia-Oceania Championship 2016 was held at the Dubai Police Club Stadium in Dubai from 7–12 March.

Results 
Legend

AS: Asian Record

WR: World Record

PB: Personal Best

SB: Season Best

Fn-False Start

Q- Qualified for Finals

q- Qualified for Finals as per best performance

DNF- Did Not Finish

DSQ- Disqualified

T11

Final 

Date- 12:March:2016

Time- 16:45

T12

Final

Date- 12:March:2016

Time- 16:57

T36

Final 

Date- 10:March:2016

Time- 17:08

T44/47

Final 

Date- 12:March:2016

Time- 17:11

T54

Final 

Date- 10:March:2016

Time- 16:52

References

IPC Athletics Asia-Oceania Championship 2016